Kan Kantathavorn (born 6 December 1985), nicknamed Fluke, is a Thai actor, model and host.

Early life
Kan graduated from the Bodindecha (Sing Singhaseni) School 2 and Chulalongkorn University.

Career
He debuted in a Thai television drama based on the life of Varayuth Milinthajinda, Dao Jarus Fa. He appeared in commercials and music videos. He is host of Workpoint Entertainment.

Personal life
On December 8, 2018, he married Ploy Iyada Kantathavorn (maiden name Srimoontree). The couple had been dating for 8 years before getting married.

Filmography

Film

Dramas

As Host 
Host of Workpoint TV
 Big Ben Show (2015)
 Bao Young Blood Season 2 (2016)
 I Can See Your Voice Thailand (2016–2022)
 Fan Pan Tae Super Fan (2016–2017)
 Fan Pan Tae (2018)
 Bao Young Blood'' Season 3 (2017)
 The Mask Singer
 Season 1 (2016–2017)
 Season 2 (2017)
 Season 3 (2017–2018)
 Season 4 (2018)
 Project A (2018)
 Line Thai (2018–2019)
 Thai Literature (2019)
 Zodiac (2019)
 The Mask Mirror (2019–2020)
 Temple Fair (2020)
 Thai Descendant (2020)
 Diva Makeover (2017–2018)
 The Wall Song (2020–)

Awards

References

1985 births
Living people
Kan Kantathavorn
Kan Kantathavorn
Kan Kantathavorn
Kan Kantathavorn
Kan Kantathavorn
Kan Kantathavorn
Kan Kantathavorn
Kan Kantathavorn
Kan Kantathavorn